Darrell Franklin Hamilton (born May 11, 1965) is a former American football tackle. He played for the Denver Broncos from 1990 to 1991.

References

1965 births
Living people
American football offensive tackles
North Carolina Tar Heels football players
Denver Broncos players